"I Like It Loud" is a song by Marc Acardipane Presents Marshall Masters Feat. The Ultimate MC, released in 1997.

The song was produced and written by Acardipane and was released on Acardipane Records/ID&T. The lyrics "My radio believe me I like it loud" originally come from the LL Cool J song 'I Can't Live Without My Radio'.

Track list

Chart performance

Scooter version 

In 2003, "I Like It Loud" was covered by German dance group Scooter as "Maria (I Like It Loud)". It was released as the third and final single from their 2003 album The Stadium Techno Experience.

History 
The version made for the single features Marc Acardipane and Dick Rules and is a remixed version of the track featured on the album. The video for the song shows Scooter performing at a night club together with Dick Rules, who acts as MC in the same way as he acts in life performances together with Marc Acardipane. In the charts, the single reached No. 4 in Germany and Austria.

The song is also used by some football clubs to boost atmosphere in the stadium, most notably as the anthem for Romanian team Steaua Bucharest, and as the goal-celebration song for German club Borussia Mönchengladbach, American club Philadelphia Union and Croatian club NK Osijek. The Philadelphia Flyers ice hockey team used it as their goal song from the 2011 Stanley Cup playoffs until the end of the 2012/13 season. Slovan Bratislava uses the song as their regular goal song during home matches. It was also used in darts by Alan Norris who used it as his walk-on music during 2016. As of the 2021/22 season, it is used as the goal song of Dutch football clubs SBV Excelsior and TOP Oss. As of 2020 it has been used by Rangers FC whenever a goal is scored.

Track listing

Trivia
During the shooting of the music video, H.P. Baxxter met his future wife.

Chart performance

Year-end chart

Certifications

Other covers 
 In 2002 was covered by the Club Robbers as a Hardstyle version and in 2007 the Hard Trance band Cosmic Guys covered the song. Marc Acardipane played the song with Dick Rules on a single in 2003.
 Canadian electronicore band Abandon All Ships recorded a short cover of this song.
 Kickboxer Gago Drago uses a version of the song remixed by Redman which includes portions of his Smash Sumthin song.

References 

Techno songs
Scooter (band) songs
1997 singles
2003 singles